Vyacheslav Akhunov (born 1948), is a Kyrgyz-born Uzbek visual artist, and author. He is known for performance art, video art, and painting. Akhunov lives in Tashkent, Uzbekistan.

Biography 
Vyacheslav Akhunov was born in 1948 in Osh, Kirghiz Soviet Socialist Republic (present day Kyrgyzstan), his mother was Russian and his father was Uzbek. He graduated in 1979 from Moscow State Institute of Art (now Moscow School of Painting, Sculpture and Architecture).

He has actively spoken out about being silenced during the Soviet years, which inspired his large-scale installation work, Breathe Quietly (1976–2013). 

Some of his notable art exhibitions include the 2nd Yinchuan Biennale, China (2018); BALAGAN!!!, Berlin (2015); 5th Moscow Biennale (2013); Pavilion of Central Asia at the Venice Biennale (2013, 2007, 2005); 1st Kiev Biennale (2012), Documenta (2013), Ostalgia, New Museum, New York (2011); Time of the Storytellers, KIASMA, Helsinki (2007); Montreal Biennale (2007); and 1st Singapore Biennale (2006).

Akhunov's work is in museum collections include the Urganch Photo Gallery, and the Auckland Art Gallery.

Publications

References 

1948 births
People from Osh
Artists from Tashkent
21st-century Uzbekistani artists
20th-century Uzbekistani artists
Uzbekistani painters
Kirghiz Soviet Socialist Republic people
Kyrgyzstani emigrants
Moscow School of Painting, Sculpture and Architecture alumni
Living people